Murray McEwan (20 September 1936 — 4 April 1984) was a New Zealand cricketer. He was a left-handed batsman  who played for Otago. He was born in Dunedin and died in Ōtaki.

McEwan made a single first-class appearance for the team, during the 1957–58 season, against Canterbury. From the middle order, he scored 6 runs in the first innings in which he batted, and 3 runs in the second, as the match finished in a draw.

See also
 List of Otago representative cricketers

External links
Murray McEwan at Cricket Archive 

1936 births
1984 deaths
New Zealand cricketers
Otago cricketers